Lists of Wizarding World cast members cover cast members of productions by Wizarding World, a fantasy media franchise. The lists include cast members of feature films.

 List of Harry Potter cast members
 List of Fantastic Beasts cast members
 List of Harry Potter and the Cursed Child cast members

Lists of actors by film series
Cast